Boott Spur is a minor peak located in Coos County, New Hampshire. The mountain is named after Francis Boott (1792–1863), and is part of the Presidential Range of the White Mountains.  Boott Spur stands on the shoulder of Mount Washington, above the south side of the headwall of Tuckerman Ravine.

Trails
The trail ultimately ends at the Davis Path  from the Pinkham Notch visitors' center. The Davis Path, originally built in 1844-5 as an alternative to the more northerly Crawford Path, is a  route from U.S. Route 302 in Crawford Notch up Montalban Ridge, over Boott Spur to the summit of Mount Washington.

The Glen Boulder Trail climbs Boott Spur from the southeast, starting at the Glen Ellis Falls parking area on New Hampshire Route 16. The trail ascends past the Glen Boulder and over the  minor summit of Gulf Peak (also known as Slide Peak), then joins the Davis Path south of the summit of Boott Spur. Gulf Peak forms the south headwall of the Gulf of Slides and is a popular destination for extreme hiking in the area.

See also

 List of mountains in New Hampshire
 White Mountain National Forest

References

Mountains of New Hampshire
Mountains of Coös County, New Hampshire
Mountain spurs